Scotty's Builders Supply was an American retailer of home improvement and construction products and services. The company that at its peak operated about 150 stores, closed in 2005.

The company was also known as Scotty's Hardware and Scotty's Home Builders.

History 

The company has its beginnings in the 1920s Florida land boom when new residents poured into the state to build houses, hotels, and other businesses. A young Georgia farmer working in Winter Haven recognized the demand for building materials and in 1924 opened "Home Builders Supply" in Winter Haven.

Evanda Hugh Sweet, a local farmer and father of James Sweet, started with one store in 1924, and in 1925, it became incorporated; from that point it grew to a total of 162 stores.

Scotty's was instrumental in helping supply building materials to the early real estate booms of Florida. Scotty's, overcome by the very competitive home improvement market, closed all the stores in 2005.

Private investment company Oak Point Partners acquired the remnant assets, consisting of any known and unknown assets that weren't previously administered, from the Scott Acquisition Corp., et al., Bankruptcy Estates on September 17, 2008.

James W. Sweet 

James (Jim) Sweet built Scotty's to a chain of more than 100 stores (162 at its peak) and $500 million in sales during a 40-year career there. Scotty’s employed more than 5,500 people during his tenure. He was a 15-year member of the Florida Council of 100 business development group. He was also a graduate of Winter Haven High School.

He died on Wednesday, October 28, 2009, at age 91 in Winter Haven, Florida.

Name changes 

1924 through 1967 - Home Builders Supply, Inc
1968 through 1972 - Scotty's Home Builders Supply, Inc
1973 through 2005 - Scotty's, Inc.

The GIB Group 
In the 1980s, the GIB Group helped Scotty's move to a new direction with a much needed influx of resources. In the 1990s, James Sweet sold all his stock and GIB became the new owners of the home improvement chain.

GIB also had interest in other home improvement retailers in the US, such as Handy Andy Home Improvement Center.

Delivery service 

Scotty's contractor and homeowner delivery service was one its major strengths.

They had many types of trucks in their fleet:

 Flatbed lift 
 Shingle boom 
 Drywall 
 Box

Stock-car racing sponsor 

In the late 1980s, Scotty's was also sponsor to Eddie King and his #16 car within the Florida circuit.

Eddie King and his Scotty's #16 car in action

References 

Home improvement retailers of the United States
Retail companies established in 1924
Retail companies disestablished in 2005
Hardware stores of the United States
1924 establishments in Florida
2005 disestablishments in Florida